Ancelot is a surname. Notable people with the surname include:

Jacques-François Ancelot (1794–1854), French dramatist and litterateur
Virginie Ancelot (1792–1875), French painter, writer, and playwright